Canovelles is a municipality situated in the comarca of Vallès Oriental, in the province of Barcelona, part of the autonomous community of Catalonia in northeastern Spain.

Demographics

Population by district

Population distribution
The vast majority of the immigrants of the last decade and their descendants live in the Barriada Nova (New Quarters). However, the members of the immigrant wave in the 1960s and 1970s are gradually moving further into the peripheral districts. Public housing shortages and the high price of private housing are driving young people out of the area, and into municipalities in the same region.

Demographic evolution

Economy
During the 1950s and 1960s, Canovelles saw a dramatic increase and immigration from other parts of Spain – namely from the nearby region of Barcelona. Because of this explosion in population, much of Canovelles’ economy stems from the service sector.

Another major source of regional economy comes from the weekly market held every Sunday, comprised by more than 500 shops. This market focus on the distribution of clothing, electronic devices and fruit.

History
Numerous archeological finds from the Neolithic Period and the Roman Empire have been found in Canovelles. One representative is the “Menhir”, a replica of which is displayed at the Can Palots Theater exhibition hall.

The first time the term Canovelles appears in a document is in 1008 AD, in a document pertaining to the Abbot of Sant Cugat.

Between the 1950s and the 1970s, many families from Extremadura and Andalusia arrived to the municipality, increasing the population by a factor of twenty. Since the end of the 1990s people from Morocco, Sub-Saharan Africa, and Latin America have been arriving to Canovelles in great numbers.

During the 1970s, clandestine groups of Marxists organized against the Franquist dictatorship, some of them comprised by more than a hundred militants.

Recent history

A celebration was held in 2008 to celebrate the oldest document (written in 1008) in which a writer mentions the municipality's name.

In 2007, Socialists' Party of Catalonia (PSC) gained an absolute majority in the municipal government under the leadership of José Orive. In 2008, this government approved a thirty percent increase in pay for the mayor and local councillors. This pay increase marked José Orive as an object of controversy when hundreds of stickers criticizing the decision were posted on lampposts and other public objects throughout the municipality. After these stickers had been up for two days, the municipal government paid a cleaning company to remove them. Orive left his position as the Mayor of Canovelles due to personal reasons. Emilio Cordero succeeded Orive as the Mayor of Canovelles in 2016.

Administration

List of mayors since the democratic elections of 1979

List of mayors from 1900 to 1979

Electoral results

1995

1999

2003

2007

Transportation

Highways
C-17 – Located on the exit by Ronda Nord and by the exit at Granollers-Canovelles BV1432 and BV1439

Railways
Granollers-Canovelles railway station – Line 3 of the Rodalies Barcelona

References

External links
Canovelles Town Hall Website (Catalan)
 Government data pages 

Municipalities in Vallès Oriental
Populated places in Vallès Oriental